Dyvin is a small town (formally a village) in Belarusian region of Polesia. Located in the Kobryn District of Brest Region, on the southern bank of the Prypiat and at the Kobryn-Kovel road, it is close to the modern borders with Poland and Ukraine.

History
First mentioned in 1466, around 1546 the village of Dyvin received city rights. Around that time the town had 184 houses, a market square and five streets in total. In 1642 king of Poland Władysław IV Vasa granted the burghers with Magdeburg Law. The charter however was withdrawn by king Stanisław August Poniatowski in 1776. In 1795 the town, along with the rest of eastern Poland, was annexed by the Russian Empire in the effect of the Partitions of Poland. Two years later the town, by then demoted to a mere village, was donated to Pyotr Rumyantsev as his personal property and its inhabitants were turned into serfs.

In 1878 the town had 2490 inhabitants, including 998 Jews . The town also had four mills, two Orthodox churches, once Catholic church and a synagogue . According to the 1921 Polish census the population of the town was 2299. Soon however the town was downgraded to a village again and attached to a gmina of Dywin.

The town became a part of Poland as a result of the 1921 Peace of Riga. It was retaken by the USSR in 1939, and annexed to the Belarusian SSR.

The German occupied the town in 1941. Jews of the town are imprisoned in a ghetto before being murdered in a mass execution in 1942 In October 1942 the first detachment of the Ukrainian Insurgent Army was created in Dyvin. In November 2012 Belarusian authorities forbade the inauguration of a memorial tablet honouring the UPA.

It remained part of the USSR following the war. It was made a town and a centre of a rayon, but in 1959 it was demoted back to a village. Since 1991 it is part of independent Belarus.

References

Villages in Belarus
Populated places in Brest Region
Brest Litovsk Voivodeship
Kobrinsky Uyezd
Polesie Voivodeship
Holocaust locations in Poland